C16 may refer to:
 , a 1908 British C-class submarine
 Sauber C16, a 1997 racing car
 IEC 60320 C16, an electrical connector used for electric kettles and other small appliances
 C16, the ICD-10 code for stomach cancer
 Caldwell 16 (NGC 7243), an open cluster in the constellation Lacerta
 C16 (drug), a protein kinase inhibitor used in scientific research
 C16 Close Area Suppression Weapon, the Heckler & Koch GMG's Canadian designation
 The 16th century A.D.
 Commodore 16, a home computer
 Palmitic acid, a common saturated fatty acid

C-16 may refer to:
 C-16 highway (Spain), a highway in Catalonia
 C-16: FBI, a 1997–98 American TV series
 Bill C-16, a Canadian law regarding gender expression and gender identity
 The Cessna 208 airliner, as designated in the U.S. Army
The French Defence, as coded in the Encyclopaedia of Chess Openings
 Carbon-16 (C-16 or 16C), an isotope of carbon